Mount Pechell is a peak (1,360 m) surmounting the west end of Hedgpeth Heights in the Anare Mountains. Discovered and rudely mapped in January 1841 by Captain James Ross, Royal Navy, who named this feature for Captain Sir Samuel J. Brooke Pechell, a junior lord of the Admiralty at that time.

Mountains of Victoria Land
Pennell Coast